World of Sin is the debut album by German heavy metal band Paragon, released in 1995.

Track listing
 "Intro" - 00:42
 "Needful Things" - 04:39
 "Maelstrom of Decline" - 05:12
 "World of Sin" - 04:24
 "Beyond the Void" - 05:50
 "Thrill of the Kill" - 04:06
 "No Hope for Life" - 05:16
 "Into the Black" - 03:35
 "Drug Fiend" - 05:15
 "Bring the Hammer Down" - 03:04

Credits
 Kay Carstens - Vocals
 Martin Christian - Guitars
 Daniel Görner - Guitars 
 Dirk Sturzbecher - Bass
 Kay Noise - Drums

1995 debut albums
Paragon (band) albums